Hayti is a census designated place and unincorporated community situated in Valley Township in Chester County, Pennsylvania, USA. The CDP was first designated as such in 2020. As of 2020, it has a population of 2,890.

Demographics

References

Unincorporated communities in Chester County, Pennsylvania
Unincorporated communities in Pennsylvania